The Sri Lanka People's Front, commonly known by its Sinhalese name Sri Lanka Podujana Peramuna (SLPP), is a political party in Sri Lanka. Previously a minor political party known as the Sri Lanka National Front (SLNF) and Our Sri Lanka Freedom Front (OSLFF), it was relaunched in 2016 as the SLPP and became the home for members of the United People's Freedom Alliance loyal to its former leader Mahinda Rajapaksa.

The party is led by former President of Sri Lanka Mahinda Rajapaksa. Sagara Kariyawasam is the general secretary of the party. G. L. Peiris was formerly the chairman of the party before defecting from it to form the Freedom People's Congress.

History

Sri Lanka National Front
The Sri Lanka National Front (Sri Lanka Jathika Peramuna) contested the 2001 Sri Lankan parliamentary election in 15 of the 22 electoral districts across the country, however the party failed to win a single seat in the Parliament of Sri Lanka after securing 719 votes (about 0.01% of all votes cast). The SLNF contested again in the 2004 Sri Lankan parliamentary election in 17 of the 22 electoral districts but once again failed to win any seats in Parliament after securing 493 votes (0.01%). SLNF leader Wimal Geeganage contested the 2005 Sri Lankan presidential election and came in eighth after securing 6,639 votes (0.07%).

The SLNF contested the 2010 Sri Lankan parliamentary election in 19 of the 22 electoral districts but failed to win any seats in Parliament after securing 5,313 votes (0.07%) across the country. Geeganage contested in the 2015 Sri Lankan presidential election and came in last place, at 19th, after securing 1,826 votes (0.02%).

Our Sri Lanka Freedom Front
In 2015, the SLNF changed its name to Our Sri Lanka Freedom Front (Ape Sri Lanka Nidahas Peramuna) and its symbol from the cricket bat to a flower bud. In early 2016, OSLFF leader Geeganage hinted that a change in the party leadership was soon to come.

Sri Lanka Podujana Peramuna
In November 2016, the OSLFF relaunched itself as the Sri Lanka Podujana Peramuna, a political front for the Joint Opposition, and appointed G. L. Peiris, former Foreign Minister of Sri Lanka and Rajapaksa ally, as its chairman. Attorney Sagara Kariyawasam, a former organizer of the Sri Lanka Freedom Party and attorney for former president Mahinda Rajapaksa and his brother Gotabaya Rajapaksa, was appointed as the party secretary. The flower bud remained as the symbol of the party. Basil Rajapaksa, another brother of Mahinda Rajapaksa, joined the SLPP shortly after it was relaunched.

In the 2018 Sri Lankan local elections, in a surprise result, the SLPP won a 40% plurality of votes, emerging as the party with the most councilors and local authorities. The SLPP contested in the election under its flower bud symbol.

In the 2019 Sri Lankan presidential election, younger brother of former president Mahinda Rajapaksa and former Defense Secretary Gotabaya Rajapaksa, contested in the elections as the SLPP candidate and later won the election and was sworn in as the new President of Sri Lanka. In the 2020 Sri Lankan parliamentary election, the SLPP won a landslide victory and a clear majority in the parliament, winning 116 seats in the Parliament of Sri Lanka. Five members of the Rajapaksa family won seats in the parliament, and former President Mahinda Rajapaksa was sworn in as the new Prime Minister.

Economic crisis 

The Rajapaksa administration introduced massive tax cuts in late 2019, which lead to a drop in government revenue that was soon compounded with the onset of the COVID-19 pandemic, which saw the island nation losing its lucrative US$3 billion tourism industry that put 200,000 out of work in 2020 and most of 2021. Although the export sector picked up by 2021 and tourism started picking up, it appeared that Sri Lanka was facing its most severe economic crisis since its independence in 1948 due to the loss of revenue from tax cuts, rampant money printing and unsustainable borrowings. By end of 2021, Sri Lanka was facing a debt crisis with a possibility of sovereign default. According to a poll conducted by Verité Research in March 2022 the government's approval rating had fallen to just 10% as a result of the crisis. Following severe shortages of fuel, the state owned Ceylon Electricity Board was forced to implement 10–13 hour power cuts across the island in late March.

The SLPP government was beginning to grow increasingly unpopular; according to a poll conducted by Verité Research in March 2022 the government's approval rating had fallen to just 10% as a result of the crisis. This triggered the 2022 Sri Lankan protests, which demanded the resignation of Gotabaya Rajapaksa and other key officials from the Rajapaksa family. On 3 April, several Rajapaksa cabinet ministers submitted their resignations. This included three ministers from the Rajapaksa family; Chamal Rajapaksa, Basil Rajapaksa and Namal Rajapaksa. The president was to announce the new cabinet the following day.

On 18 April, Rajapaksa appointed 17 new cabinet members, selected among his party members. This move was seen as a sign of Rajapaksa's lack of willingness to listen and adhere to the protesters' demands.

On 9 May 2022, Prime Minister Mahinda Rajapaksa tendered his resignation to the President. Rajapaksa was heavily criticised by netizens and the public for resigning after instigating violence against peaceful protests. Ranil Wickremesinghe was sworn in as the new Prime Minister on 12 May.

Eventually, protests peaked on 9 July, after large numbers of protesters gathered at Chatham Street, Colombo, near the President's House, demanding his immediate resignation. Protesters also broke into the Presidential Secretariat and Temple Trees, the Prime Minister's official residence and gathered around the private residence of Prime Minister Ranil Wickremesinghe.

The speaker of the Parliament issued a statement that night that President Rajapaksa would resign from office on 13 July 2022. Political parties including the Opposition agreed to form an all-party interim government after President's resignation. Prime Minister Wickremesinghe also announced that he would be willing to resign, saying that he would do so once a new government was formed.

Self-exile and resignation of Gotabaya Rajapaksa 
On the morning of 13 July, President Gotabaya Rajapaksa fled Sri Lanka and appointed Prime Minister Ranil Wickremesinghe as acting president in his absence. President Rajapaksa emailed a letter of resignation to the Speaker of the Parliament on 14 July the next day, thus marking the end of Gotabaya Rajapaksa's presidency. The news of his resignation was celebrated by the public mainly at Galle Face and also in the other parts of Colombo.

On 15 July, the Speaker Mahinda Yapa Abewardhana announced the official resignation of President Gotabaya Rajapaksa. Ranil Wickremesinghe was officially sworn in as the acting president, and was later elected by the Parliament of Sri Lanka to complete the remainder of Rajapaksa's term.

Ideology 
The SLPP split from the Sri Lanka Freedom Party (SLFP), a centre-left, Sinhalese nationalist, and post-colonial party, which political scientist Jayadeva Uyangoda described as "a progressive, social democratic, centre-left political party, that made tremendous contribution to social change and democracy". The SLPP borrowed the elements of nationalism from the SLFP, but not its economic outlook.

In 2019, the SLPP began to perform better than the SLFP, which did not field a candidate for the 2019 presidential election. The split and rightward turn of the SLPP towards neo-nationalism and right-wing populism corresponded with the shifts of the nation's two other major parties: Anura Kumara Dissanayake's Janatha Vimukthi Peramuna on the left moved closer to social democracy and Sajith Premadasa's free-market oriented United National Party moved closer to welfarism. Uyangoda described the SLPP as "a right wing, neo-conservative party that favours authoritarianism", and commented: "Though ironically created by the SLFP, the SLPP doesn't replace it, it merely displaces it. The SLPP will undoubtedly tread a free market-oriented path but have Mahinda Rajapaksa to disguise its policy in state-capitalist rhetoric."

Ahead of the 2019 elections, Deshika Elapata, a junior researcher of the European Institute for Asian Studies, described the SLPP as "a socially right-wing and economically left-wing party rooted in Sinhalese nationalism and social democracy". The party is opposed to federalism in Sri Lanka.

Electoral history

See also 
 2018 Sri Lankan constitutional crisis
 2022 Sri Lankan political crisis
 2022 Sri Lankan protests
 Rajapaksa family

Notes

References

External links 
 The SLFP's crisis

Political parties in Sri Lanka
Populist parties